South Carolina Highway 114 (SC 114) is a  state highway in the U.S. state of South Carolina. The highway travels through rural areas of Union County. The highway has both termini at SC 18 and passes to the east of Jonesville. It is officially designated as a west–east highway, but is physically north–south.

Route description
SC 114 begins at an intersection with SC 18 (Jonesville Highway) north of Bonham, within Union County. It travels to the north-northeast to an intersection with SC 9 (Jonesville–Lockhart Highway). The highway curves to the northwest, crosses over Sandy Run Creek, and meets its northern terminus, another intersection with SC 18.

Major intersections

See also

References

External links

SC 114 at Virginia Highways' South Carolina Highways Annex

114
Transportation in Union County, South Carolina